Bryant Meeks (January 16, 1926 – May 30, 2007) was an American football center and linebacker. He played for the Pittsburgh Steelers from 1947 to 1948.

He died on May 30, 2007, in Dublin, Georgia at age 81.

References

1926 births
2007 deaths
Players of American football from Jacksonville, Florida
American football centers
American football linebackers
Georgia Bulldogs football players
South Carolina Gamecocks football players
Pittsburgh Steelers players